The Varna gudgeon (Gobio kovatschevi) is a species of gudgeon, a small freshwater in the family Cyprinidae. It is endemic to the Provadiskaya River in Bulgaria.

References

 

Gobio
Fish described in 1937
Freshwater fish of Europe
Endemic fauna of Bulgaria